A gubernatorial election was held on 3 February 2002 to elect the next governor of , a prefecture of Japan in the north-west of the island of Kyushu.

Candidates 
Genjiro Kaneko, former representative, first elected in 1998, endorsed by LDP.
Akira Takamura, for the JCP.

Results

References 

2004 elections in Japan
Nagasaki gubernational elections